Arthur Pattison (20 September 1903 – 6 December 1968) was a South African cricketer. He played in sixteen first-class matches between 1925/26 and 1931/32.

See also
 List of Eastern Province representative cricketers

References

External links
 

1903 births
1968 deaths
South African cricketers
Eastern Province cricketers
Rhodesia cricketers
People from Makhanda, Eastern Cape
Cricketers from the Eastern Cape